Miss Universe Malaysia 2013, the 47th edition of the Miss Universe Malaysia, was held on 10 December 2012 at Shah Alam, Selangor. Carey Ng of Putrajaya was crowned by the outgoing titleholder, Kimberley Leggett of Penang at the end of the event. She then represented Malaysia at the Miss Universe 2013 pageant in Moscow, Russia.

Results

Contestants
The official Top 17 finalists of The Next Miss Universe Malaysia 2013.

Crossovers 
Contestants who previously competed/appeared at other national beauty pageants:

Miss Universe
 2017 - Samantha Katie James (Unplaced)

Miss Universe Malaysia
 2017 - Samantha Katie James (Winner)

Asia's Next Top Model Season 3
 2015 - Shareeta Selvaraj (14th placed)

ATV Miss Asia Malaysia
 2014 - Leanndrea Anne Paramaraj (3rd Runner-up)

Miss Wilayah Kebaya
 2013 - Leanndrea Anne Paramaraj (2nd Runner-up)

Miss World Harvest Festival
 2012 - Karissa Kara Simon (2nd Runner-up)

Miss World Malaysia
 2011 - May Salitah Naru Kiob (Finalists Top 25)

Miss Earth Malaysia
 2010 - May Salitah Naru Kiob (Top 10)

Miss Earth Sabah
 2010 - May Salitah Naru Kiob (Winner)

References

External links

2013 beauty pageants
2013 in Malaysia
2013